A. Bert Meerstadt (born 13 October 1961) is a Dutch businessman. He is the CEO of Baarsma Wine Group. He was chairman of the management Board and CEO of Nederlandse Spoorwegen from January 2009 to October 2013.

Meerstadt received a master's degree in Architectural Engineering from Delft University of Technology in 1986, and an MBA from INSEAD in 1988.

Since 2014 Meerstadt is a director of Talgo, Spain.

He was a director of ABN-AMRO.

On 8 April 2016, Meerstadt resigned from the supervisory board of Lucas Bols.

Since 2016 he is chairman of Coffreo, France.

He also serves on the board of the Dutch digital consultancy SparkOptimus.

References

1961 births
Living people
Dutch chief executives in the rail transport industry
Businesspeople from The Hague
Delft University of Technology alumni
INSEAD alumni
People named in the Panama Papers